The  is a railway line operated by East Japan Railway Company (JR East) which connects the cities of Kashiwazaki and Niigata in Niigata Prefecture, Japan. The line's name is taken from the name of the ancient Echigo Province, which corresponds to most of modern-day Niigata Prefecture.

History
.
The Echigo Railway Co. opened the Hakusan - Kashiwazaki section of the line in 1912, and was nationalised in 1927. In 1951, the Hakusan - Niigata section was opened, CTC signalling was commissioned in 1982, the line was electrified at 1,500 V DC in 1984, and freight services ceased in 1987.

Former connecting lines
Teradomari Station: The Nagaoka Railway Co. opened a 39 km line to Raikoji (on the Shin'etsu Line) between 1915 and 1921. This company introduced Japan's first diesel railcar in 1928, and in 1951 electrified 31 km of the line at 750 V DC in 70 days, completing the balance the following year. Significant typhoon damage occurred in 1966, and in 1972, passenger services ceased between Raikoji and Nishinagaoka, with the entire line becoming freight-only three years later. The line closed in 1995.
Sekiya Station: The Niigata Kotsu Co. opened a 34 km line, electrified at 1,500 V DC, to Tsubame on the Yahiko Line between 1933 and 1934. Freight services ceased in 1982, and the line closed between 1993 and 1999.

Services

Although most services are operated to and from Niigata Station, operations are divided into two sections: Kashiwazaki –  and Yoshida – Niigata.

Between Kashiwazaki and Yoshida, there is a period of over three hours where no trains operate. Between Niigata and Uchino there are three trains per hour, with another one to two trains per hour to Yoshida.

Station list 
 All stations are located within Niigata Prefecture.
 Trains can pass each other at stations marked "◇", "∨", and "∧"; they cannot pass at stations marked "｜".

Rolling stock
 E129 series 2/4-car EMUs (since December 2014)

Previous
 115 series 3-car EMUs (until March 2022)
 165 series
 E127 series 2-car EMUs (Yoshida - Niigata) (until March 2022)

References

External links

 Stations of the Echigo Line (JR East) 

 
Lines of East Japan Railway Company
Rail transport in Niigata Prefecture
Railway lines opened in 1912
1067 mm gauge railways in Japan
1912 establishments in Japan